The island chain strategy is a strategic maritime containment plan first conceived by American foreign policy statesman John Foster Dulles in 1951, during the Korean War. It proposed surrounding the Soviet Union and China with naval bases in the West Pacific to project power and restrict sea access.

The "island chain" concept did not become a major theme in American foreign policy during the Cold War, but after the dissolution of the Soviet Union has remained a major focus of both American and Chinese geopolitical and military analysts to this day. For the United States, the island chain strategy is a significant part of the force projection of the U.S. military in the Far East.  For China, the concept is integral to its maritime security and fears of strategic encirclement by U.S. armed forces. For both sides, the island chain strategy emphasizes the geographical and strategic importance of Taiwan.

First Island Chain 

The First Island Chain is defined as the chain of islands that begins at the Kuril Islands, runs through the Japanese archipelago, the Ryukyu Islands and Taiwan, the northwestern portion of the Philippines (particularly Luzon, Mindoro and Palawan) and finishes towards Borneo, and used to extend to the Spratly Island and the southern Vietnamese coast prior to the Vietnam War.  The chain also serves as the maritime boundaries between the East China Sea and the Philippine Sea, and the South China Sea and the Sulu Sea.

The First Island Chain was conceptualized during the Cold War as the first line of defense to contain the spread of influence of the Soviet Union and its allied socialist countries in East and Southeast Asia. The midpoint and key part of the first chain was – and still is — Taiwan.  Because the island chain is composed of a series of landmasses, it is also called the "unsinkable aircraft carrier", especially in reference to Taiwan.

Second Island Chain 
The Second Island Chain can refer to two different interpretations, but the version most commonly used refers to the island chain which is formed by Japan's Bonin Islands and Volcano Islands, in addition to the Mariana Islands (most notably Guam, an unincorporated American overseas territory with a heavily fortified military base), western Caroline Islands (Yap and Palau), and extends to Western New Guinea. The chain serves as the eastern maritime boundary of the Philippine Sea.

As it is located within the middle portion of the West Pacific, it acts as a second strategic defense line for the United States.

Third Island Chain 
The Third Island Chain is the final part of the strategy. This island chain begins at the Aleutian Islands and runs south across the center of the Pacific Ocean towards Oceania, through the Hawaiian Islands, American Samoa and Fiji, to reach New Zealand. Australia serves as the staple between the second and third chains.

Proposed Fourth and Fifth Island Chains
The Asia Maritime Transparency Initiative (AMTI), a group under the Center for Strategic and International Studies, argues that a fourth and a fifth island chain should be added to an overall understanding of Chinese maritime strategy in the Indo-Pacific.  Whereas the first three island chains are located in the Pacific Ocean, these two newly proposed ones are in the Indian Ocean, which would reflect the growing Chinese interest in the region.

The proposed fourth chain would include places like Lakshadweep, the Maldives and Diego Garcia to disrupt the String of Pearls waypoints towards the Persian Gulf such as the Gwadar Port and Hambantota; while the proposed fifth chain would originate from Camp Lemonnier in the Gulf of Aden, around the Horn of Africa and along the entire East African coastline through the Mozambique Channel (between Mozambique and Madagascar, including the Comoro Islands) towards South Africa, to encircle the Chinese naval base at Doraleh, Djibouti and sabotage China's trade with Africa.

Target and events 
The primary target of the doctrine was originally the Soviet Union; however, additional targets also included the People's Republic of China, Vietnam, Russia and North Korea. After the dissolution of the Soviet Union in 1991 and China's economic prominence in the early 21st century, China became the major target of the doctrine.

See also 
 Rimland
 United States foreign policy toward the People's Republic of China

References 

Geopolitics
Military strategy
Geopolitical rivalry